Torksey railway station was a station in Torksey, Lincolnshire on the line between Lincoln and Retford.  It closed to passengers in 1959, but part of the line remained in use for freight traffic (serving a nearby fuel oil depot) until the early 1980s. Torksey Viaduct remains as a Grade II Listed Structure.

References

External links
Then & now photo pair
Photo & account of Torksey viaduct

Disused railway stations in Lincolnshire
Former Great Central Railway stations
Railway stations in Great Britain opened in 1850
Railway stations in Great Britain closed in 1959